The National Assembly of the Republic of Belarus is the bicameral parliament of Belarus. The two chambers of the National Assembly are:

the Council of the Republic – the upper house
the House of Representatives – the lower house.

While each chamber has specific duties, both chambers have the ability to veto the decrees of local administrations that deviate from the Constitution of Belarus. The chambers of the National Assembly are convened to two regular sessions every year: the first session opens 2 October and its duration cannot be more than 80 days; the second session opens 2 April and does not last more than 90 days.

The House of Representatives and the Council of the Republic may be convened to an extraordinary session. Extraordinary sessions are convened under a particular agenda upon an initiative of the President or upon a request of at least two-thirds majority of the full membership of each of the chambers.

Any bill must be initially considered in the House of Representatives and then in the Council of the Republic. In practice, the National Assembly has no real power. The Belarusian political system concentrates all governing power in the hands of President Alexander Lukashenko. Notably, the National Assembly has no control over government spending; according to the Constitution, any bill that increases or decreases spending can only be considered with presidential permission. Presidential decrees have greater weight than ordinary legislation. However, since it took its current form in 1996, the National Assembly has been dominated by Lukashenko's supporters in any event, and there is no substantive opposition to presidential decisions.

Its predecessor was the Supreme Council of Belarus (until 1996).

Sources

 
Government of Belarus
1996 establishments in Belarus
Belarus
Belarus
Politics of Belarus